Document 1 is the second EP by English indie pop band House of Brothers.

References

House of Brothers albums
2009 EPs